"Malaika" is a Swahili song written by Tanzanian musician Adam Salim in 1945.

Malaika may also refer to:

 Malaika (name), a female given name
 Malaika (group), a South African Afro-pop music group
 Malaika (spider), a genus of South African spiders
 Malaika (singer) (born 1972), African American dance singer
 Malaika (actress) (born 1989), Ugandan actress, media personality, model and fashionista
 Malā'ikah, the Islamic view of angels